Qaziyan (also Romanized as Qāzīyān, Qāzeyān, and Qāzīān; also known as Ghāzeyān, Ghāzīān, and Kazian) is a village in Saravan Rural District, Sangar District, Rasht County, Gilan Province, Iran. At the 2006 census, its population was 3,196, in 899 families.

References 

Populated places in Rasht County